Elijah Wilkinson (born February 10, 1995) is an American football offensive tackle for the Atlanta Falcons of the National Football League (NFL). He played college football at Massachusetts. He has also been a member of the Denver Broncos.

Professional career

Denver Broncos
Wilkinson signed with the Denver Broncos as an undrafted free agent on May 11, 2017. He was waived by the Broncos on September 2, 2017 and was signed to the practice squad the next day. He was promoted to the active roster on October 21, 2017.

Wilkinson signed a one-year restricted free agent tender with the Broncos on April 18, 2020. He was placed on the active/physically unable to perform list at the start of training camp on July 28, 2020, and moved back to the active roster six days later. He started the first three games of 2020 at right tackle before being placed on injured reserve on September 30, 2020, with a fractured shinbone. He was activated on November 21, 2020.

Chicago Bears
Wilkinson signed a one-year contract with the Chicago Bears on March 23, 2021.

Atlanta Falcons 
On March 17, 2022, Wilkinson signed a one-year contract with the Atlanta Falcons. He was named the starting left guard to begin the season. He started seven games before being placed on injured reserve on November 5, 2022. He was activated on December 17.

References

External links
UMass Minutemen bio
Denver Broncos bio

1995 births
Living people
American football offensive tackles
Chicago Bears players
Denver Broncos players
People from Downingtown, Pennsylvania
Players of American football from Pennsylvania
Sportspeople from Chester County, Pennsylvania
UMass Minutemen football players
Atlanta Falcons players